Nazas   is one of the 39 municipalities of Durango, in north-western Mexico. The municipal seat lies at Nazas. The municipality covers an area of 2,412.8 km².

As of 2010, the municipality had a total population of 12,411, up from 12,166 as of 2005. 

As of 2010, the town of Nazas had a population of 3,622. Other than the town of Nazas, the municipality had 78 localities, the largest of which (with 2010 populations in parentheses) were: General Lázaro Cárdenas (Pueblo Nuevo) (1,927) and Paso Nacional (1,366), classified as rural.

References

Municipalities of Durango